Cyrtarachne raniceps is a species of spider of the genus Cyrtarachne. It is found in India and Sri Lanka. It is 9 mm long and has brown carapace with a heart shaped sternum.

See also 
 List of Araneidae species

References

Araneidae
Spiders of Asia
Spiders described in 1900